Graveyard is the debut studio album by Swedish hard rock band Graveyard, released on September 10, 2007 by Swedish label Transubstans Records and February 19, 2008 on American label TeePee Records. The album received good reviews and critical acclaim.

Track listing 
"Evil Ways" – 3:28
"Thin Line" – 5:24
"Lost in Confusion" – 3:23
"Don't Take Us for Fools" – 4:02
"Blue Soul" – 6:17
"Submarine Blues" – 2:25
"As the Years Pass By, the Hours Bend" – 4:41
"Right Is Wrong" – 4:27
"Satan's Finest" – 5:31

References

External links 
 

2008 albums
Graveyard (band) albums
Tee Pee Records albums